Constance Picaud (born 5 July 1998) is a French professional footballer who plays as a goalkeeper for Division 1 Féminine club Paris Saint-Germain and the France national team.

Club career
On 16 July 2021, Picaud joined Paris Saint-Germain on a three-year deal until June 2024.

International career
Picaud is a former France youth international and have played for the under-17 team twice in 2015. She received her first call-up to the senior team in February 2021. She made her debut for the team on 18 February 2023 in a 5–1 win against Uruguay.

Career statistics

Club

International

Honours
Paris Saint-Germain
 Coupe de France: 2021–22

References

External links
 
 

1998 births
Living people
Women's association football goalkeepers
French women's footballers
France women's youth international footballers
France women's international footballers
Division 1 Féminine players
Division 2 Féminine players
Le Havre AC (women) players
Paris Saint-Germain Féminine players